Letter to the King is a 2014 Norwegian drama film directed by Hisham Zaman.

Cast 
 Ali Bag Salimi - Mirza
 Zheer Durhan - Zirek
 Nazmi Kirik - Miro
 Hassan Dimirci - Champion
 Ivan Anderson - Beritan
 Derin Kader - Lorin
 Raouf Saraj - Rebin

References

External links 

2014 drama films
Norwegian drama films